The German ship Doggerbank (Schiff 53) was a UK cargo ship that was built in Scotland in 1926, captured by the German Navy in 1941, renamed Doggerbank and converted into an auxiliary minelayer and blockade runner. The German U-Boot U-43 (1939) sank her by mistake in 1943, leading to the deaths of all but one of her 257 passengers and 108 crew.

Doggerbank was built in Scotland in 1926 as Speybank, one of 18 Inverbank-class motor ships for Andrew Weir & Co's Bank Line. She was the first of three Bank Line ships that were called Speybank. The second was built in England in 1962 and sold in 1978. The third was built in 1983 as Okha, bought in 1995 and renamed Speybank, and was still in service in 2009.

Building
Harland & Wolff built Speybank at Govan, Glasgow, launching her on 25 February 1926 and completing her on 20 April that year. She had twin screws, each driven by a six-cylinder single-acting diesel engine.

Andrew Weir & Co registered Speybank in Glasgow. Her United Kingdom official number was 148902 and her code letters were KTWS. By 1930 she was equipped for wireless telegraphy, and in 1934 she was given the new call sign GLQF, which also superseded her code letters.

Capture
On 31 January 1941 the  captured Speybank in the Indian Ocean and put aboard her a prize crew commanded by KptLt Paul Schneidewind. He took her to German-occupied France, reaching Bordeaux on 10 May 1941.

The Kriegsmarine renamed her Doggerbank – Schiff 53 (German: "Ship 53") and converted to an auxiliary minelayer. She was disguised with false name Levernbank, which was another member of Bank Line's Inverbank class. She remained under Schneidewind's command.

Doggerbank left France in January 1942 to lay mines off the coast of South Africa and then to proceed to Japan. She successfully laid the mines in March and April 1942 and reached Japan later that year.

On 13 March the Royal Navy cruiser  stopped Doggerbank. Doggerbank identified herself as the Bank Line ship Levernbank, which satisfied Durban, who let her continue. The next day the Royal Navy armed merchant cruiser  challenged Doggerbank. Doggerbank again identified herself as a British freighter, and Cheshire let her proceed.

Final voyage
In Japan, Doggerbank took aboard many of the survivors of the auxiliary cruiser  and the German tanker Uckermark, the former Altmark, which had been destroyed in an accident in Yokohama on 30 November 1942. When she left the Far East, Doggerbank carried a total of 365 men: her own crew of 108, plus 257 men from the other two ships. She also carried a cargo of 7,000 tons of raw materials and rubber, fats and fish oil.

Doggerbank travelled via Kobe, Saigon, Singapore and Jakarta, which she left on 10 January 1943, heading back to France. In mid-Atlantic on 3 March 1943 she was travelling ahead of schedule when the U-boat  mistook her for a British ship "of the  type". U-43 fired a spread of three torpedoes, all three of which hit her. She sank within two minutes, with perhaps 200 men killed instantly.

Aftermath
U-43 saw Doggerbank launch five lifeboats, and tried to find the survivors, but failed to get close enough in the darkness. Doggerbank had been unable to transmit a distress signal, so the German Naval High Command took days to realise she had been lost.

The eventual sole survivor of the crew of 108 and the 257 others on board, Fritz Kürt, was in Doggerbank'''s jolly boat, together with the ship's captain, Schneidewind, a small number of other men and the ship's dog. The boat headed for the South American coast, about three weeks's sailing away. Through suicide and accidents, the small crew was eventually reduced to two, Kürt and an old sailor by the name of Boywitt, the captain having shot himself and the ship's dog having drowned. Desperate for water and food, Boywitt drank sea water on the 19th day of their journey and died, while Kürt was too weak to even roll the dead body overboard. Kürt was rescued on 29 March by the Spanish motor tanker Campoamor, which took him to Aruba.U-43'' was sunk on 30 July 1943 without survivors.

Kürt was exchanged in a prisoner-of-war swap in 1944, reported back to the German Navy, and then hid in Hamburg until the end of the war, as he was about to be arrested.

References

Bibliography

Further reading

External links
 
 

1926 ships
Friendly fire incidents of World War II
Maritime incidents in March 1943
Ships built in Govan
Ships built by Harland and Wolff
Ships sunk by German submarines in World War II
World War II auxiliary ships of Germany
World War II merchant ships of the United Kingdom
World War II minelayers of Germany
World War II shipwrecks in the Atlantic Ocean